Mary Brooks Picken (August 6, 1886, Arcadia, KS – March 8, 1981, Williamsport, PA) was an American author of 96 books on needlework, sewing, and textile arts. Her Fashion Dictionary, published by Funk and Wagnalls in 1957, is the first dictionary in the English language to be published by a woman.

Career
She founded the Woman's Institute of Domestic Arts and Sciences in Scranton, Pennsylvania. An expert on fashion, Picken was an authority on dress, fabric, design, and sewing. She taught "Economics of Fashion" at Columbia University and was one of the five founding directors of the Metropolitan Museum of Art's Costume Institute. She was the first woman to be named a trustee of the State University of New York's Fashion Institute of Technology, by Thomas E. Dewey, the Governor of New York, in 1951.

When vice-president of the G. Lynn Sumner advertising agency she designed the course material for the Richard Hudnut Du Barry Success Course.

She was a member of the National Academy of Sciences National Research Council's Advisory Committee on Women's Clothing, which selected Hattie Carnegie as the designer of the United States Army's women's uniform and provided advice and assistance on all elements of the U.S. Army's women's uniform beginning in 1949. Picken was one of the founders of the Fashion Group, now the Fashion Group International, a nonprofit professional association.  She also served as chairman of its board.

Personal life
She was married to G. Lynn Sumner, president of the advertising firm of G. Lynn Sumner Co. of New York. Picken died on March 8, 1981, at a nursing home in Williamsport, Pennsylvania.

Published works

1915
 Corsets And Close-fitting Patterns - No. 4
 Drafting and plain dressmaking - 3 A-2
 Fancy aprons and sunbonnets
 Millinery Stitches, Department of Millinery, Instruction Paper with Examination Questions
 Skeleton Foundations, Parts 1 & 2, No. 102 A & B, Department of Millinery, Instruction Paper with Examination Questions
 Solid Foundations, Parts 1 & 2, No. 103 A & B, Department of Millinery, Instruction Paper with Examination Questions
 Braid Hats, No. 104, Department of Millinery, Instruction Paper with Examination Questions
 Piece-Goods Hats, No. 105, Department of Millinery, Instruction Paper with Examination Questions
 Essential Stitches and Seams, Part 1, No. 1 A-3, Department of Sewing, Instruction Paper with Examination Questions
 Pattern Drafting, No. 2-3, Department of Sewing, Instruction Paper with Examination Questions
 Tight Linings and Boning, No. 5-2
 Essential Stitches and Seams, Part 2, No. 1 B

1916
 Millinery Facings
 A Glossary of Millinery Terms, Department of Millinery
 Developing Hats of Braid, Department of Millinery
 Fancy and Draped Crowns, Department of Millinery, Instruction Paper with Examination Questions
 Tailored Buttonholes and Buttons, Instruction Paper with Examination Questions
 Woolen Materials and Tailored Plackets No. 12, Department of Sewing (First Ed); Department of Tailoring, (1922 Ed), Instruction Paper with Examination Questions
 Harmony of Dress, 11-2, Department of Sewing, Instruction Paper with Examination Questions
 Fancy aprons and sunbonnets
 Underwear and lingerie 10 B; Department of Sewing, later published as Plain Undergarments, No. 202
 Tailored Skirts, Woman's Institute of Domestic Arts & Sciences, Instruction Paper with Examination Questions
 Embroidery Stitches Parts 1 and 2, No. 7-A & 7-B, Department of Sewing, Woman’s Institute of Domestic Arts & Sciences Inc., Instruction Paper with Examination Questions
 Remodeling and Renovating, No. 17, Department of Dressmaking, Instruction Paper with Examination Questions

1917
 Maternity and Infants' Garments - No. 19-2
 Miscellaneous garments 22

1918
 The Secrets of Distinctive Dress

1919
 Millinery Made Easy, 70WI, Department of Millinery, advertising pamphlet for course in millinery, reprinted in 1921, 1922, 1923, & 1924

1920
 Drafting And Plain Dressmaking - Part 2 - No. 3 B-2
 Patterns For Children And Misses' Garments - No. 18
 Pattern Drafting - No. 2-3
 Tight Linings And Bonings - No. 5-2
 Laces, Silks, And Linen - No. 6
 The Dressmaker And Tailor Shop - No. 25-2

1920
 Underwear And Lingerie
 Harmony of Dress - No. 11-2
 Corsets and Close Fitting Patterns
 Tailored Skirts - No. 13
 Woman's Institute Fashion Service; Instruction Quarterly included "Smart Designs ... With Detailed Instructions for Making"; Woman's Institute Magazine published monthly at least through Spring of 1930

1922
Tailored Pockets, Woman's Institute of Domestic Arts & Sciences
Tight Linings and Boning, Woman's Institute of Domestic Arts & Sciences 
House Aprons and Caps, No. 405, Woman's Institute of Domestic Arts & Sciences, Instruction Paper with Examination Questions

1923
Woolen Materials and Tailored Plackets, Woman's Institute of Domestic Arts & Sciences, Instruction Paper with Examination Questions
 Individualizing Tissue-Paper Patterns, No. 403, Instruction Paper with Examination Questions
 Tailored Seams and Plackets, No. 414, Instruction Paper with Examination Questions
Textiles and Sewing Materials, Women's Institute of Domestic Arts & Sciences

1925
 The Mary Brooks Picken Method Of Modern Dressmaking 
 Underwear and Lingerie, Part 1, No 407-A, Instruction Paper with Examination Questions
 Designing and Planning Clothes, No. 415, Instruction Paper with Examination Questions

1927
 How to Make Dresses the Modern Singer Way (Singer Sewing Library No. 2) (reissued 1928, 1929, 1930)

1929
 How to make draperies, slip covers, cushions and other home furnishings the modern Singer way (Singer Sewing Library)

1930
Sewing Secrets, Modern Methods of Stitching, Decorating and Finishing, The Spool Cotton Company  (reissued 1934)

1931
 Laundering and Dry Cleaning, Woman's Institute of Domestic Arts & Sciences 

1933
Principles of Tailoring, Woman's Institute of Domestic Arts & Sciences 

1939
 The language of fashion: Dictionary and digest of fabric, sewing and dress, Mary Brooks Picken school, Incorporated

1941
Sewing For the Home, New York and London, Harper & Brothers

1943
Mending Made Easy, The ABC and XYZ of Fabric Conservation, Harper & Brothers

1949Singer Sewing Book, New York, Singer Sewing Machine Co.

1955
Sewing Magic
Needlepoint Made Easy

1956
 Dressmakers of France: The who, how, and why of the French couture, Harper, 1956.

1957
 The Fashion Dictionary, Funk and Wagnalls, 1957. (1973 edition , 1999 Dover republication )

1993
 Old-Fashioned Ribbon Trimmings and Flowers. 
1999
 A Dictionary of Costume and Fashion: Historic and Modern (unabridged Dover Books republication of The Fashion Dictionary, 1957).

References

1886 births
1981 deaths
Fashion Institute of Technology people
20th-century American non-fiction writers